The Three-Cornered Hat (also spelled as Three Cornered Hat) is a 1935 Italian comedy film  directed  by Mario Camerini and starring Eduardo and Peppino De Filippo. It is a Naples-set adaptation of the Pedro Antonio de Alarcón's  novella with the same name.

The film was shot at the Cines Studios in Rome.

Plot
In the seventeenth century the Spanish governor of Naples harassed the population. Among the populace he notices a beautiful miller whom he falls in love with; to seduce her, she puts Luca, her husband, in jail, but he manages to escape and even disguises himself as a governor and penetrates the palace up to the governor's bedroom. Meanwhile, his wife Carmela manages to hold off the governor who has gone to the mill. The governor and Luca agree to punish the cheater who, when he returns home, is unable to be opened by the guards who treat him as an impostor.

Cast 
Eduardo De Filippo as Don Teofilo, The Governor 
Peppino De Filippo as  Luca
Leda Gloria as  Carmela
Dina Perbellini as Donna Dolores
Enrico Viarisio as  Garduna
 Arturo Falconi as  il capitano della guardia
 Giuseppe Pierozzi as Pasqualino, il mugnaio
Cesare Zoppetti as  Salvatore
Gorella Gori as  Concettina
 Mauro Serra as  Carlone
Tina Pica as  Assunta
 Cesare Barbetti as  Don Teofilo's Son

References

External links

Italian comedy films
1935 comedy films
1935 films
Films based on Spanish novels
Films based on works by Pedro Antonio de Alarcón
Italian black-and-white films
Films directed by Mario Camerini
Cines Studios films
Films set in the Spanish Empire
Films set in the 17th century
Films set in Naples
1930s Italian films
1930s Italian-language films